Sugarloaf Mountain is a mountain located in Greene County, New York. 
The mountain is part of the Devil's Path range of the Catskill Mountains.
To the northwest, Sugarloaf is separated from Plateau Mountain by Mink Hollow Notch; to the southeast, Sugarloaf is separated from Twin Mountain by Pecoy Notch.

Sugarloaf Mountain stands within the watershed of the Hudson River, which drains into New York Bay. 
The northeastern slopes of Sugarloaf Mtn. drain into Schoharie Creek, thence into the Mohawk River, and the Hudson River. 
The northwestern slopes of Sugarloaf drain into Roaring Kill, thence into Schoharie Creek. 
The southwestern and southeastern slopes of Sugarloaf drain into Beaver Kill, thence into Esopus Creek, and the Hudson River. 

Sugarloaf Mountain is within New York's Catskill State Park.
The Devil's Path hiking trail traverses the summit ridge of Sugarloaf. 
The Long Path, a 357 mi (575 km) long-distance hiking trail through southeastern New York, is contiguous with this stretch of the Devil's Path.

Notes

See also 

 List of mountains in New York
 List of mountains named Sugarloaf

External links 
 Sugarloaf Mountain Hiking Information Catskill 3500 Club
 
 
 

Mountains of Greene County, New York
Catskill High Peaks
Geography of Greene County, New York